António Correia may refer to:

 António Correia (admiral) (c. 1487–1566), Portuguese commander who conquered Bahrain in 1521
 António Correia (Angolan footballer) (born 1983), Angolan footballer
 Antonio Correia (Cape Verde footballer) (born 1993), Cape Verde footballer
 António Correia (sailor) (born 1933), Portuguese Olympic sailor
 António Correia de Oliveira (1879–1960), Portuguese poet
 António Jesus Correia (1924–2003), Portuguese footballer and roller hockey player
 António Mendes Correia (1888–1960), Portuguese anthropologist, physician and scientist